Ampelius was Archbishop of Milan from 671 to 676. He is honoured as a saint in the Catholic Church.

Life
Almost nothing is known about the life and the episcopate of Ampelius.  He ruled the diocese of Milan in a period marked by the troubles due to the Lombards. Ampelius is remembered as man able to do miracles, but we have no detail about his acts.

Goffredo da Bussero in the 15th century informs us that his feast day was the 8 February, possibly the date of his death. His feast day is now celebrated on July 7 in the Roman Rite and on July 8 in the Ambrosian Rite. 
He was buried in the Basilica of St. Simplician where his relics are still venerated under the main altar.

Notes

External links
Saints.SQPN: Ampelius of Milan
Santiebeati: Ampelius of Milan

Archbishops of Milan
676 deaths
Italian Roman Catholic saints
Medieval Italian saints
7th-century Christian saints
Year of birth unknown